Triad Motorsports was a motorsports team that competed in the NASCAR Winston Cup Series and ARCA Menards Series from 1993 to 1999. The team was owned by Jim Wilson. The team's drivers included Gary Bradberry, Billy Standridge and Randy MacDonald.

NASCAR 
The team debuted the No. 78 Ford Thunderbird in 1993 at the First Union 400 at North Wilkesboro Speedway with driver Jay Hedgecock. Hedgecock would miss the race. They would attempt Pocono later that year, again missing the race. Hedgecock would qualify the 78 at the fall Wilkesboro event. Hedgecock would return in 1994, qualifying for both races he attempted. Pancho Carter would also attempt three races, qualifying for one. Carter would again attempt three races in 1995, and would once again only make one. Canadian driver Randy MacDonald would join the team in 1996 with limited success. The team did however score its first big sponsorship break, with country music band Diamond Rio and Hanes coming aboard. MacDonald had declared for Rookie of the Year, however, success was again limited. MacDonald would attempt 12 races, only qualifying for three. Following his DNQ at the 1996 Southern 500, MacDonald was released in favor of  Billy Standridge. Standridge would qualify for three races and was signed for the 1997 season. For the first time, Triad would attempt their first full season. The effort would once again prove futile, as Standridge would only qualify for five of the first 17 races. Standridge would leave and re-open his own team. He would be replaced by Gary Bradberry, who had been released by TriStar Motorsports earlier that season. Bradberry would successfully qualify for eight out of 12 races he attempted with the team. At the end of the season, Bradberry was announced to be the team's full time driver for 1998, with sponsorship from Pilot Travel Centers and Flying J. The team's hopes of a successful season began to falter, as Bradberry only timed in with lap of 48.967 at 183 mph in his new Ford Taurus, leaving him 52nd of the 55 drivers entered. The team's former driver Standridge, would qualify 20th in his year old, underfunded, self owned 47 Ford Thunderbird. After starting 21st in his duel, Bradberry came up two spots short of advancing and missed the 500. Bradberry would not qualify until the fourth race of the season at Atlanta, starting 20th. The race, would go extremely bad, as the car only lasted 12 laps, leaving Bradberry and the 78 43rd. The 78 would miss the next two races before qualifying in fine fashion at Texas, starting 10th and finishing 24th. Following two more DNQ's, Bradberry would qualify for Fontana, Charlotte and Dover. Despite this, the team would skip Richmond, and instead return at Michigan, finishing 34th. The team would skip, Pocono, Infineon and New Hampshire, the latter which saw Bradberry take a turn behind the wheel of the ISM Racing Pontiac, known as the "Tobasco Fiasco", finishing 40th after an engine failure. Bradberry and Triad would return at the second Pocono race, missing the show. At the 1998 Brickyard 400, during second round qualifying, Bradberry had a hard crash in turn 2. Team and driver would not make another start until the 1998 Southern 500, finishing 37th. The team would make the final three races of the season, finishing no better than 28th. The team would set eyes in 1999, with Bradberry returning. However, like the previous two seasons, the team would miss the 500. Following three withdrawals and sponsorship problems, owner Jim Wilson had enough, and shut his team down, never to be seen in NASCAR again.

Car No. 78 results

ARCA 
Triad would run four ARCA races, all in 1996, two with MacDonald and two with Standridge. MacDonald would score the pole position at the first Pocono race, but would break an oil pump and finish 16th. Standridge's best run came at Charlotte, where he started 3rd and finished 14th.

References
https://us.motorsport.com/nascar-cup/news/no-78-triad-ford-team-in-sponsorship-limbo/951806/
https://www.racing-reference.info/owner/Jim_Wilson

External links
 Owner Jim Wilson's Statistics

Defunct NASCAR teams
ARCA Menards Series teams